Ross Allen Myers (born 1959) is an American naval aviator and a retired vice admiral in the United States Navy, who served as deputy commander of the United States Cyber Command from May 2019 to September 2020. He was nominated in March 2020 to be the commander of the United States Tenth Fleet/U.S. Fleet Cyber Command, replacing retiring Vice Admiral Timothy J. White. As a naval aviator, he has commanded several warships and military units, including fleet replacement squadron, Carrier air wing, and air group.

As part of Sailors' Union of the Pacific, he served twice at Naval Air Facility Atsugi, as a commander for Carrier Air Wing Five military unit stationed at Japan.

Education
Myers was raised in Garden City, Kansas. He completed a Bachelor of Science in Accounting at Kansas State University and, later, went to the University of Kansas where he graduated with a Master of Business Administration. After completing his master's degree, he then attended the National War College where he read for a Master of Science in National Security Strategy.

Naval career

In shore and staff tours, Myers has serving as a flag aide for the commander in chief Allied Naval Forces Southern Europe in Italy and for the commander in chief United States Naval Forces Europe in England. He also served as joint assessments analyst and executive assistant for assessments, resources, and warfare requirements to the Deputy Chief of Naval Operations, and as deputy executive assistant to the Chief of Naval Operations. He was later appointed to assistant deputy director for global operations to the Joint Staff, and executive assistant to the Vice Chairman of the Joint Chiefs of Staff. As a flag officer, he served on the Joint Staff as vice deputy director for Nuclear, Homeland Defense and Current Operations, and director of Plans and Policy at headquarters U.S. Cyber Command. In May 2019, Myers was promoted to vice admiral and appointed deputy commander of United States Cyber Command. He assumed command of United States Tenth Fleet/U.S. Fleet Cyber Command in September 2020.

Awards and decorations

References

Date of birth missing (living people)
1959 births
Living people
Place of birth missing (living people)
People from Garden City, Kansas
Kansas State University alumni
Military personnel from Kansas
United States Naval Aviators
University of Kansas alumni
National War College alumni
Recipients of the Legion of Merit
United States Navy vice admirals
Recipients of the Defense Superior Service Medal
Recipients of the Defense Distinguished Service Medal